The 2004–05 Northern Counties East Football League season was the 23rd in the history of Northern Counties East Football League, a football competition in England.

Premier Division

The Premier Division featured 17 clubs which competed in the previous season, along with three new clubs, promoted from Division One:
Long Eaton United
Maltby Main
Shirebrook Town

League table

Division One

Division One featured 15 clubs which competed in the previous season, along with one new clubs:
Retford United, joined from the Central Midlands League

League table

References

External links
 Northern Counties East Football League

2004-05
9